Garryowen is a 1920 British silent sports film directed by George Pearson and starring Fred Groves, Hugh E. Wright and Moyna Macgill. It was based on a novel by Henry De Vere Stacpoole. It concerns an impoverished Irish gentleman who tries to rescue his family from ruin by running his horse Garryowen at The Derby.

Cast
 Fred Groves - Michael French 
 Hugh E. Wright - Moriarty 
 Moyna Macgill - Violet Grimshaw 
 Bertram Burleigh - Robert Dashwood 
 Arthur Cleave - Giveean 
 Alec Thompson - Andy 
 Little Zillah - Effy French 
 Stella Brereton - Mrs. Moriarty 
 Lilian Braithwaite - Mrs. Driscoll 
 Marjorie Gaffney - Biddy 
 Betty Cameron - Susie

References

External links

1920 films
British horse racing films
1920s sports films
1920s English-language films
Films directed by George Pearson
Films based on Irish novels
Films based on works by Henry De Vere Stacpoole
British silent feature films
British black-and-white films
1920s British films
Silent sports films